Rezaabad (also Romanized as Reẕāābād) is a village in Kharturan Rural District, Beyarjomand District, Shahrud County, Semnan Province, Iran. At the 2006 census, its population was 277, in 67 families.

References 

Populated places in Shahrud County